Race for the White House is an American political television show that discusses various presidential election campaigns throughout United States history. It premiered on March 6, 2016, on CNN. The series is narrated by Kevin Spacey, well known at the time of production for playing fictional President Frank Underwood in the US version of House of Cards. After Spacey faced allegations of child sexual abuse, the narration was re-recorded by Spacey's House of Cards co-star Mahershala Ali. Netflix Canada still streamed the original version with Kevin Spacey's audio narration until September 1, 2020, when the show was removed in Canada.

On January 9, 2020, it was announced that the second season would premiere on February 16, 2020.

Episodes

Season 1 (2016)

† denotes an extended episode.

Season 2 (2020)

Broadcast
Internationally, the series premiered in Australia on History on October 3, 2016.

References

External links
Official website

CNN original programming
2010s American television news shows
2016 American television series debuts
English-language television shows